Laura Jean Moffatt (née Field; born 9 April 1954) is a British Labour Party politician who was the Member of Parliament (MP) for Crawley from 1997 until 2010.

Early life
Born Laura Jean Field in London in 1954, she was educated at Hazelwick School in Crawley, West Sussex before attending the Crawley College of Technology (now renamed Central Sussex College).

From 1975 until her election to the House of Commons in 1997, she worked as a state registered nurse at Crawley Hospital. She joined the Labour Party in 1979 and was elected to Crawley Borough Council in 1984, remaining as a councillor until 1997 and serving as the town's mayor in 1990.

Parliamentary career
Moffatt stood in Crawley at the 1992 general election, but lost out to the sitting Conservative MP Nicholas Soames. For the following election she was again selected as the Labour candidate, though this time through an all-women shortlist.

At the 2005 general election she was elected to the Commons on the smallest majority in the country with 37 votes, with her share of the vote falling by over 10 percent from the 2001 general election result. After an epic count, and numerous re-counts, Moffatt broke down in tears after being returned to Parliament.

In the Commons, Moffatt served variously as a Parliamentary Private Secretary (PPS) to the Lord Chancellor Derry Irvine (2001–03); the Secretary of State for Constitutional Affairs Charles Falconer (2003–05); the Secretary of State for Work and Pensions David Blunkett (2005); the Minister of State at the Department for Education and Skills Jacqui Smith (2005–06), and from 2006 served as the PPS to Alan Johnson initially as Secretary of State for Education and Skills and since 2007 as Secretary of State for Health. From 1997 to 2001 she served as a member of the Defence Select Committee.

On 15 March 2010, Moffatt announced her intention to stand down at the 2010 General Election because the job had taken a toll on her family life.

Personal life
She married Colin Moffatt in 1975 in Crawley and they have three sons. She lives in the Broadfield area of the town.

In May 2009, Moffatt made the news during the MPs' expenses row for giving up her flat in London because she said that the "annual cost did not sit comfortably with me", in her blog she wrote: "I never travel first class when commuting and since getting rid of my flat I more often sleep on a camp bed in my office when the house sits late … and have only made one claim for personal goods in 2007/08, under £20, I think, to replace some towels."

Moffatt has said she has felt unsafe travelling late at night on trains as she has been the victim of a flasher on two occasions on a late night train. She has a tattoo on her left foot of a Labour rose with the number '37' in order to remind her of her slim majority in 2005.

References

External links
Official Website
Guardian Unlimited Politics – Ask Aristotle: Laura Moffatt MP
TheyWorkForYou.com – Laura Moffatt MP
BBC Politics Profile

News items
Supporting Muslim women after London bombings in 2005
Having the support of John Prescott in 2005

1954 births
20th-century British women politicians
21st-century British women politicians
People educated at Hazelwick School
Councillors in West Sussex
English nurses
Female members of the Parliament of the United Kingdom for English constituencies
Living people
Labour Party (UK) MPs for English constituencies
Mayors of places in West Sussex
People from Battersea
People from Crawley
UK MPs 1997–2001
UK MPs 2001–2005
UK MPs 2005–2010
Women mayors of places in England
20th-century English women
20th-century English people
21st-century English women
21st-century English people
Women councillors in England